The 2013 Open GDF Suez was a women's professional tennis tournament played on indoor hard courts. It was the 21st edition of the Open GDF Suez (formerly known as the Open Gaz de France) and a Premier tournament on the 2013 WTA Tour. It took place at Stade Pierre de Coubertin in Paris, France from January 26 through February 3, 2013.

Points and prize money

Point distribution

Prize money

* per team

Singles main-draw entrants

Seeds 

1 Rankings as of January 14, 2013

Other entrants 
The following players received wildcards into the main draw:
 Petra Kvitová
 Kristina Mladenovic
 Pauline Parmentier
 Lucie Šafářová

The following players received entry from the qualifying draw:
 Monica Niculescu
 Virginie Razzano
 Magdaléna Rybáriková
 Stefanie Vögele

The following player received entry as lucky loser:
 Kiki Bertens

Withdrawals
Before the tournament
 Lucie Hradecká (viral illness)
 Kaia Kanepi
 Venus Williams (back injury)

Retirements
 Kiki Bertens (back injury)
 Magdaléna Rybáriková (viral illness)

Doubles main-draw entrants

Seeds 

1 Rankings are as of January 14, 2013

Other entrants 
The following pairs received wildcards into the doubles main draw:
  Julie Coin /  Pauline Parmentier
  Petra Kvitová /  Yanina Wickmayer

Retirements
During the tournament
 Lucie Šafářová (right knee injury)

Champions

Singles 

 Mona Barthel def.  Sara Errani, 7–5, 7–6(7–4)

Doubles 

 Sara Errani /  Roberta Vinci def.  Andrea Hlaváčková /  Liezel Huber, 6–1, 6–1

References

External links 
Official website

Open GDF Suez
Open GDF Suez
Open GDF Suez
2013 in Paris
2014 in French tennis